Pealtnägija ('Eyewitness') is an Estonian investigative journalism television program. The program was launched on 29 September 1999 in ETV, being therefore the oldest running investigative television program in Estonia.

Television statistics shows that about 20% of Estonia's population watches this television program.

Notable interviewees:
 Paolo Coelho
 Phil Collins
 Jakob von Uexküll
 George Soros.

References

External links
 About the television program, ETV.ee

Estonian television series
Eesti Televisioon original programming